Kisaan is a 2009 Indian Hindi-language action thriller film directed by Puneet Sira, starring Sohail Khan, Arbaaz Khan, Jackie Shroff, Dia Mirza and Nauheed Cyrusi. Released on 28 August 2009 to praise for Sohail Khan's performance but criticism for the story and music, the film was a major commercial failure.

Plot
Widower farmer, Dayal Singh, based in Palheri in the District of Chandigarh, witnesses the exploitation of farmers at the hands of Zamindars. He decides to send his elder son, Aman, to the city to study and become a lawyer, while his second son, Jiggar, would live with him and assist him in farming. Years later, the district gets a visit from Sohan Seth, who wants to buy the farm and turn the area into a commercial zone. Aman returns home and is able to join hands with his father and brother in advising the locales against Sohan. Things get out of hand when Jiggar is arrested for Assault, and even though Aman defends him, is sentenced to five years in prison. After his discharge, Jiggar returns home to find his father bed-ridden, half of his body paralyzed, a number of farmers have committed suicide, while Aman, who has married his sweetheart-fellow lawyer, Priya, lives in the city, works for Sohan, and has been putting pressure on Dayal as well as other farmers to sell their respective farmlands. Meanwhile, Priya is collecting proofs against Sohan Seth, she is attacked and killed by his men. Aman finds out and he helps his brother in taking down his men. Aman reconciles with his father. Jigar marries Titli. They are shown working together on the family fields along with a recovering Dayal.

Cast
 Sohail Khan as Jigar Singh  
 Arbaaz Khan as Aman Singh 
 Dia Mirza   as Priya Kaur
 Jackie Shroff as Dayal Singh
 Dalip Tahil as Sohan Seth
 Peter Nunn as Mooney
 Nauheed Cyrusi as Titli Kaur
 Dwij Yadav as Young Jigar Singh

Soundtrack

The soundtrack was composed by Daboo Malik and released by T-Series on 9 June 2009.

Release
The film was theatrically released on 28 August 2009.

Home media
The film was released on DVD by Moser Baer in NTSC format with a free DVD.
It is also streaming on Netflix.

Reception
Shubhra Gupta from The Indian Express gave the film 2 stars out of 5, praising the first half while criticizing the second, especially the violence. Nithya Ramani from Rediff.com gave the film a half star out of 5, praising Sohail Khan's performance while criticizing the casting, other performances especially that of Arbaaz Khan and music.

References

External links
 

2000s Hindi-language films
2009 films
Indian action drama films
Indian action thriller films
Films about farmers' suicides in India